Captain George Anson Byron, 8th Baron Byron (30 June 1818 – 28 November 1870) was a British nobleman, army officer, peer, politician, and the eighth Baron Byron, as the son of Admiral George Anson Byron, 7th Baron Byron, who was the cousin of Romantic poet and writer George Gordon Byron, 6th Baron Byron.

Life 
Byron was the son of Admiral George Anson Byron, 7th Baron Byron and Elizabeth Mary Chandos-Pole. He gained the rank of captain in the 19th Foot in 1842. He succeeded to the title of 8th Baron Byron in 1868 upon the death of his father.

Lord Byron died on 28 November 1870, and was succeeded by his nephew, George Frederick William Byron, 9th Baron Byron (born 1855).

Family
Lord Byron married Lucy Elizabeth Jane Wescomb, daughter of Reverend William Wescomb and Jane Douglas, in 1843. They had no children.

Arms

References

1818 births
1870 deaths
19th-century British Army personnel
George
Green Howards officers
Barons Byron